Conesus  is a hamlet (and census-designated place) in the town of Conesus, Livingston County, New York, United States. The population of the CDP was 308 at the 2010 census, out of 2,473 in the entire town of Conesus. In 2010 the CDP was listed as "Conesus Hamlet".

Geography
The Conesus CDP includes the hamlet of Conesus on the north side of the valley of South McMillan Creek, as well as the smaller hamlet of Union Corners  to the north. New York State Route 15 passes through both hamlets, leading north  to Livonia and southeast the same distance to Springwater.

The hamlet sits on a topographic bench  in elevation above Conesus Lake, the westernmost of New York's Finger Lakes.

Demographics

References

Census-designated places in New York (state)
Census-designated places in Livingston County, New York
Hamlets in New York (state)
Hamlets in Livingston County, New York